Hazel Elizabeth Branch (1886–1973) was an American entomologist. Branch was affiliated with the American Society of Zoologists and the Academy for the Advancement of Science. Branch was also the president of the Kansas Academy of Science.

Biography
Branch was born on October 1, 1886 in Concordia, Kansas. She attended the University of Kansas, where she received a Bachelor's degree in 1908 and a Master's degree in English in 1912. She received her PhD. in Entomology from Cornell University in 1921. Branch joined Fairmount College (later renamed to Wichita State University) in 1922, as Professor and Head of the Department of Biology, and later became Professor and Head of the Department of Zoology.

Branch died on August 24, 1973, in Wichita. In 1975, the Hazel Branch Endowed Scholarship at Wichita State University was established from her estate, awarded to students majoring in biology with intent to attend a medical school.

Affiliations
Phi Beta Kappa
American Society of Zoologists
American Association for the Advancement of Science (Fellow) 
Kansas Academy of Science (President)
American Association of University Professors (President, Wichita Chapter)

Publications

References 

1886 births
1973 deaths
Cornell University College of Agriculture and Life Sciences alumni
Wichita State University faculty
Women entomologists
American entomologists
20th-century American women scientists
University of Kansas alumni
People from Concordia, Kansas
20th-century American zoologists